The 1965 European Rowing Championships were rowing championships held on the Wedau regatta course in the West German city of Duisburg. This edition of the European Rowing Championships was held from 20 to 22 August for women, and from 26 to 29 August for men. Women entered in five boat classes (W1x, W2x, W4x+, W4+, W8+), and 12 countries sent 36 boats. Men competed in all seven Olympic boat classes (M1x, M2x, M2-, M2+, M4-, M4+, M8+), and 22 countries sent 89 boats. East German crews did not attend the championships.

German participation
FISA, the International Rowing Federation, did not recognise East Germany as a country and insisted on one German team per boat class. In June 1965, the East German rowing federation put an application to the world governing body to be recognised as an independent state; this was the seventh time that they had applied for independence. There was insufficient time to discuss the issue at the congress held in Duisburg just prior to the men's competition, but FISA president Thomas Keller said that an extra-ordinary congress to be held in November in Vienna would discuss the issue, and that he personally saw no problem with solving the problems.

East German teams did not compete at these championships. Helena Smalman-Smith, who maintains a website on English women's rowing, puts forward three theories about their absence: there was "the possibility of defection from an event in West Germany", "not wanting the athletes to see how much more prosperous the western part of their country" had become, and putting pressure on FISA to change their stance on a combined German team.

Medal summary – women's events

The finals for the women were held on 22 August.

Medal summary – men's events

The regatta for men was held from 26 to 29 August. The Soviet Union was the only country to have boats in all finals.

Medals table 

The table shows the aggregate results for men and women. The overall winner was the Soviet Union with seven gold medals, followed by West Germany with two gold medals. The Soviet Union managed to win a medal in all 12 boat classes. A total of 12 countries won medals.

References

European Rowing Championships
European Rowing Championships
Rowing
Rowing
Rowing
Sport in Duisburg